Giallo is the Italian term designating mystery fiction and thrillers.

Giallo may also refer to:
 Giallo (2009 film), an Italian horror giallo film
 Giallo (1933 film), an Italian comedy thriller film
 Giallo (TV channel), an Italian free television channel
 Verdicchio or giallo, a white Italian wine grape variety